The Shambhala Botanic Gardens are young botanical gardens, formally opened in 2003, and located on the  campus of the Shambhala Mountain Center, 4921 County Rd 68-C, Red Feather Lakes, Colorado, United States. An admission fee is charged.

 Zen garden, with plants having connections to Buddhism
 Rocky Mountain native plants garden, with more than 100 species
 Vegetable and cut-flower garden

The campus also contains a bird sanctuary.

External links
Shambhala Botanic Gardens

See also 
 List of botanical gardens in the United States

Arboreta in Colorado
Botanical gardens in Colorado
Buddhism in Colorado
Protected areas of Larimer County, Colorado